Alexandre Guillaume Mouslier de Moissy, was a French writer and dramaturge. He was born in 1712 in Paris where he died on 8 November 1777.

Biography 
He was a royal guard when, at the age of 38, he was advised to assume a literary career. Encouraged by the success of his first work, he produced others.

Works 
Theater
Le Bienfait anonyme, ou le Faux Généreux, comedy, Paris, Hôtel de Bourgogne, 10 December 1744
Le Provincial à Paris ou le Pouvoir de l'amour et de la raison, comedy, Théâtre italien de Paris, 4 May 1750
Les Fausses Inconstances, comedy, Théâtre italien de Paris, 22 September 1750
Le Valet maître, comedy, Paris, Théâtre de la rue des Fossés Saint-Germain, 6 October 1751
La Nouvelle École des femmes, comedy, Théâtre italien de Paris, 6 April 1758
L'Ennuyé, ou l'Embarras du choix, comedy, Paris, Hôtel de Bourgogne, 1 March 1759
L'Impromptu de l'amour, comedy, Théâtre italien de Paris, 19 November 1759
La Nouvelle École des maris, comedy, Paris, Hôtel de Bourgogne, 6 April 1758
Bélisaire, epic comedy, 1759
Les Deux Frères, ou la Prévention vaincue, comedy, Paris, Théâtre de la rue des Fossés Saint-Germain, 27 July 1768 pdf
Œuvres de théatre, 1768
Le Vertueux mourant, drama, 1770
La Vraie Mère, drama didactic-comedy, 1771
Proverbes dramatic
Les Jeux de la petite Thalie, ou nouveaux petits drames dialogués sur des proverbes, propres à former les mœurs des enfants et des jeunes personnes, depuis l'âge de cinq ans jusqu'à vingt, 1764
École dramatique de l'homme, suite des Jeux de la petite Thalie, âge viril, depuis 20 ans jusqu'à 50, 1770
Varia
Lettres galantes et morales du marquis de *** au comte de ****, 1757
Vérités philosophiques, tirées des Nuits d'Young, et mises en vers libres sous differents titres relatifs aux sujets qui sont traités dans chaque article, 1770
Petit Recueil de physique et de morale, à l'usage des dames, contenant : Le nouveau présent de noce ; Le pour et le contre de la vie humaine, 1771
Essai sur l'éducation, poème, 1773  pdf
La Nature philosophe, ou Dictionnaire de comparaisons et similitudes, agréables et instructives, adaptées aux sujets et aux mots de la langue française qui en sont susceptibles, enrichi d'un supplément de questions à résoudre, 1776

Notes

Source biography
 Ferdinand Hoefer, Nouvelle Biographie générale, t. 35, Paris, Firmin-Didot, 1853, p. 778-9

External links
 (fr) Ses pièces de théâtre et leurs représentations on site CÉSAR
 Penny Brown, A Critical History of French Children's Literature: The beginnings, 1600-1830, New York: Routledge, 2007. .

1712 births
1777 deaths
Writers from Paris
18th-century French dramatists and playwrights
French children's writers